Slimane or Sliman is an alternative of Suleiman (in Arabic name ) being the Arabic version of the name Solomon. The name means "man of peace". It is also a common given name and surname. It may refer to

Given name
Sliman
Sliman Mansour (born 1947), Palestinian painter
Sliman Murshid or Salman al-Murshid (1907–1946), Syrian Alawi religious figure and political leader 
Sliman Ourak, Tunisian politician

Slimane
Slimane of Morocco (1766–1822), Sultan of Morocco from 1792 to 1822
Slimane Azem (1918–1983), Algerian singer and poet
Slimane Dazi, French actor
Slimane Hadj Abderrahmane (1973–2013), Danish citizen held in extrajudicial detention in the United States Guantanamo Bay detention camps
Slimane Khalfaoui (born 1975), French-Algerian terrorist convicted of the Strasbourg Cathedral bombing plot in 2004
Slimane Nebchi (born 1989), French-Algerian singer, 2016 winner of The Voice: la plus belle voix known by the mononym Slimane
Slimane Raho (born 1975), Algerian football player 
Slimane Saoudi (born 1975), Algerian tennis player

Surname
Sliman
Agamemnon Sliman or Agamemnon Schliemann (1878-1954), Greek diplomat and ambassador to the United States (1914)
Allan Sliman (1906-1945), Scottish footballer
Ramzi Ben Sliman (born 1982), French film director and screenwriter

Slimane
Hedi Slimane (born 1968), French-Tunisian photographer and fashion designer
Radhouane Slimane (born 1980), Tunisian basketball player
Yacine Ait-Slimane (born 1995), Canadian soccer player

See also
Suleiman
Solomon (disambiguation)
Sleiman
Soliman (disambiguation)
Sulaiman (disambiguation)
Sulejman
Sulayman
Suleyman
Süleymanoğlu